The 1890 Penn Quakers football team represented the University of Pennsylvania in the 1890 college football season. The Quakers finished with an 11–3 record in their third year under head coach E. O. Wagenhorst. Significant games included victories over Rutgers (16–4 and 20–12), Penn State (20–0), and Lehigh (8–0 and 17–14), and losses to Princeton (6–0) and Yale (60–0).  The 1890 Penn team outscored its opponents by a combined total of 259 to 134. No Penn players were honored on the 1890 College Football All-America Team.

Schedule

References

Penn
Penn Quakers football seasons
Penn Quakers football